The Studiorum Novi Testamenti Societas (SNTS) is an international society of New Testament scholars. The current president is John Kloppenborg (Canada). The SNTS publishes the academic journal New Testament Studies.

Presidents 
Since 1947, the SNTS' presidents have been:

References

Biblical studies organizations
New Testament
Organizations established in 1947